Zgornji Žerjavci (or WWII-era Kranichsbühel) is a settlement in the Municipality of Lenart in northeastern Slovenia. It lies in the valley of Velka Creek, a left tributary of the Pesnica River in the Slovene Hills. The area is part of the traditional region of Styria. It is now included in the Drava Statistical Region.

A large number of Roman-period burial mounds have been identified near the settlement.

References

External links
Zgornji Žerjavci on Geopedia

Populated places in the Municipality of Lenart